The 1997–98 Princeton Tigers men's basketball team represented Princeton University in intercollegiate college basketball during the 1997–98 NCAA Division I men's basketball season. The head coach was Bill Carmody and the team co-captains were Steve Goodrich and Mitch Henderson. The team played its home games in the Jadwin Gymnasium on the University campus in Princeton, New Jersey, and was the repeat undefeated champion of the Ivy League, which earned them an invitation to the 64-team 1998 NCAA Division I men's basketball tournament where they were seeded fifth in the East Region and advanced to the second round. Over the course of the season, the team achieved the highest winning percentage in the nation (93.1%, 27–2).  It also established the current school record of 20 consecutive wins surpassing the 19-game streak achieved twice, including the prior season.

Using the Princeton offense, the team posted a 27–2 overall record and a 14–0 conference record.  The team entered the tournament on a 19-game winning streak. In a March 12, 1998 NCAA Division I men's basketball tournament East Regional first round game at the Hartford Civic Center in Hartford, Connecticut, the fifth-seeded Tigers defeated  69–57.  Then two days later in the second round the team lost to the Michigan State Spartans 63–56.

The team's season-opening 62–56 win against Texas in the Coaches vs. Cancer Classic on November 11, 1997, was the team's last win against a ranked opponent until the 2011–12 team defeated Harvard on February 11, 2012. During the season, the team entered the fourth Associated Press Top Twenty-five Poll (for the week of December 2) ranked twenty-fifth and climbed steadily each week until it ended the season ranked eighth. The team also finished the season ranked eighth in the final USAToday/NABC Coaches Poll.

The team was led by first team All-Ivy League selections Goodrich and Gabe Lewullis.  Goodrich, who finished second in the conference in scoring with a 16.1 average in conference games, earned the Ivy League Men's Basketball Player of the Year award as well as second team Academic All-American recognition from College Sports Information Directors of America. Goodrich was also a 1998 NCAA Men's Basketball All-American honorable mention selection by the Associated Press.  With two first team selections and two second team selections (Brian Earl & Mitch Henderson), this was the fourth team (and third Princeton team) to have four first and second team selections.

The team won the tenth of twelve consecutive national statistical championships in scoring defense with a 51.4 points allowed average.  The team also led the nation in assist-turnover ratio (1.63) and fewest turnovers per game (10.14).  The assist-to-turnover ration was a national record that lasted until 2005. The team continues to be a contributor to the national record  for combined single-game three-point field goal shooting percentage (72.4%, minimum 20 made) stemming from a February 20, 1998, contest in which they made 12 of 15 attempts, while  made 9 of 14 attempts.  Two-time defending Ivy League field goal percentage statistical champion Goodrich was unable to repeat a third time, but instead he won the three-point field goal shooting percentage title with a 51.4% average.

Rankings

Regular season
The team posted a 27-2 (14-0 Ivy League) record.

! = Coaches vs. Cancer Classic, East Rutherford, N.J.
@ = Jimmy V Classic, East Rutherford, N.J.
 # = ECAC Holiday Festival, New York, N.Y.
$ = NCAA East Regional, Hartford, Conn.

Home games in CAPS

NCAA tournament
The team was seeded fifth and advanced to the second round of the 1998 NCAA Division I men's basketball tournament.

NCAA Tournament
March 12, 1998, in Hartford, Conn.: (5) Princeton 69, (12) UNLV 57
March 14, 1998, in Hartford, Conn.: (4) Michigan State 63, (5) Princeton 56

Awards and honors
 Steve Goodrich
 Ivy League Men's Basketball Player of the Year
 First Team All-Ivy League
 Academic All Ivy
 Academic All-America, second team
 1998 NCAA Men's Basketball All-Americans, Associated Press honorable mention
 All-East
 Gabe Lewullis
 First Team All-Ivy League
 Mitch Henderson
 Second Team All-Ivy League
 James Mastaglio
 Honorable Mention All-Ivy League

References

Princeton Tigers men's basketball seasons
Princeton Tigers
Prince
Prince
Princeton